Alexandru Zveaghințev (born 26 July 1987) is a Moldovan goalkeeper who currently is playing for FC Dinamo-Auto Tiraspol .

References 
 

1987 births
Living people
Moldovan footballers
People from Tiraspol
FC Tiraspol players
FC Dinamo-Auto Tiraspol players
FC Sheriff Tiraspol players
Association football goalkeepers